In comics, Knockout may refer to:

 Knockout (UK comics), one of two British comic series
 Knockout (DC Comics), a DC Comics character
 Knockout, a member of Marvel Comics' Femme Fatales
 Codename: Knockout, a Vertigo series